Rob Simonsen is an American composer based in Los Angeles.

Early life
Simonsen began playing the piano by ear at an early age. His grandmother was a voice teacher and music was around him in his family home. He later studied music at Southern Oregon University, the University of Oregon and Portland State University.

Career
Rob's first break into film composing was the independent feature Westender in 2003. In 2004 he teamed up with composer Mychael Danna and has provided additional music and arrangements on Surf's Up, Fracture, Moneyball, and the Oscar-winning Life of Pi. Simonsen and Danna co-wrote the score of (500) Days of Summer, and Joss Whedon's television series Dollhouse. Simonsen's work includes the Sundance Film Festival features The Way, Way Back and The Spectacular Now; the Lionsgate feature film The Age of Adaline; and most recently Love, Simon and Stargirl.

In 2009 he opened his own studio, and The Hollywood Reporter named him one of the "15 Composers Primed to Take Their Place on the A List."

Simonsen's music can be heard in nearly all iPhone 5 ads, and he appears in them as the conductor. "Red", one of his tracks for iPhone 5, has gained wide recognition. His music was featured in Coca-Cola's 2018 Super Bowl TV spot, "The Wonder of Us".

On September 6, 2019, Simonsen released his first solo album, Rêveries, on Sony Masterworks.

Awards
World Soundtrack Award (nomination):  Discovery of the Year for The Spectacular Now, The Way, Way Back (2013)
International Film Music Critics Award (nomination):  Best Original Score for an Action/Adventure/Thriller Film for Nerve (2016)

Filmography

Films
Westender (2003)
Two Fisted (2004)
Eve and the Fire Horse (2005)
Lonely Hearts (2006) additional music
Surf's Up (2007) additional music
Stone of Destiny (2008) additional music
Management (2008) co-composed with Mychael Danna
The Imaginarium of Doctor Parnassus (2009) additional music
(500) Days of Summer (2009) co-composed with Mychael Danna
All Good Things (2010)
The Brooklyn Brothers Beat the Best (2011)
Moneyball (2011) additional music
The English Teacher (2012)
LOL (2012)
The Final Member (2012) Documentary
Seeking a Friend for the End of the World (2012), composed with Jonathan Sadoff
Girl Most Likely (2012)
Life of Pi (2012) additional music
The Spectacular Now (2013)
The Way, Way Back (2013)
Wish I Was Here (2014)
Chu and Blossom (2014)
Foxcatcher (2014) (additional music by Mychael Danna and West Dylan Thordson)
The Age of Adaline (2015) (additional music by Duncan Blickenstaff)
Burnt (2015)
Stonewall (2015)
Nerve (2016)
Viral (2016)
Miss Stevens (2016)
Demain tout commence (2016)
Going in Style (2017)
Gifted (2017) (additional music by Duncan Blickenstaff)
The House of Tomorrow (2017)
The Only Living Boy in New York (2017) (additional music by Duncan Blickenstaff)
The Upside (2017)
Father Figures (2017)
Tully (2018)
Love, Simon (2018)
The Front Runner (2018)
Captive State (2019)
Fast Color (2019)
Our Friend (2019)
The Way Back (2020)
Stargirl (2020)
Ghostbusters: Afterlife (2021)
The Adam Project (2022)
Hollywood Stargirl (2022) (additional music by Duncan Blickenstaff)
The Whale (2022)

Television
Dollhouse (series) (2009–2010)
Battleground (series) (2012)
Blue Bloods (series) (2010–2013)
Life in Pieces (series) (2015–2017)
Stranger Things (series) (2022)

Discography 
Studio albums

 Rêveries (2019)

References

External links

1978 births
American film score composers
American male film score composers
American television composers
Living people
Male television composers
Portland State University alumni
Southern Oregon University alumni
University of Oregon alumni